The Electoral division of West Devon was an electoral division in the Tasmanian Legislative Council of Australia. It existed from 1946, when it was created from rural areas of Mersey, to 1997, when it was renamed Emu Bay.

Members

See also
Tasmanian Legislative Council electoral divisions

References
Past election results for West Devon

Former electoral districts of Tasmania
1997 disestablishments in Australia